Camden Township is an inactive township in Ray County, in the U.S. state of Missouri. It is part of the Kansas City metropolitan area.

History
Camden Township was organized in 1841, taking its name from the community of Camden, Missouri.

References

Townships in Ray County, Missouri
Townships in Missouri
Populated places established in 1841
1841 establishments in Missouri